Danny Seward is a British television actor and singer-songwriter who was born in Salford, Greater Manchester, England.

He started his career at the age of 15 under the tuition of David Johnson at the Oldham Theatre Workshop. He landed his first TV role in the soap Emmerdale for 3 episodes playing Greg Cox. Soon after, he won a major television role playing the part of cocky P.C Dean Wishaw in BBC2's award-winning TV series The Cops.  The show won two consecutive BAFTA awards for Best Drama Series in 1999 and 2000, plus an RTS award.

During 2001–2005 Danny Seward appeared on the ITV drama series Where The Heart Is, playing Joe Beresford. His character was involved in a musical storyline, which led EMI to sign him to record an album.

Danny's debut album Where My Heart Is features 2 self-penned tracks including "Heart of A Winner", inspired by British boxing champion Ricky Hatton). He subsequently developed the idea for a DVD titled Ricky Hatton - A Life Story. Seward was executive producer for the DVD, which features "Heart Of A Winner" as its title theme, as well as a music video for the song which featured on the DVD along with an interview with Hatton and Seward.

In December 2005, Danny Seward sang alongside Elaine Paige and John Barrowman in a Christmas concert performed at the Birmingham Symphony Hall with the BBC Symphony Orchestra. The show featured him on piano and was aired on BBC Radio 2 as part of their Christmas season.

2007 saw Danny appear in The Tudors, alongside Jonathan Rhys Meyers. Alongside his Acting work Danny went on to study a degree in Music production. In 2013 Danny passed with a 1st class honours in Popular Music and Recording from the 'University of Salford'. His acting appearances whilst at university included 'Survivors (BBC1) max Beesley', 'Doctors', 'Monroe' (ITV), and he also starred as the lead in 'Robin Hood' as 'Robin' (Norwich Theatre Royal) alongside Tony Slattery ('Whose line is it anyway') and Helen Atkinson Wood ('Black Adder').

Dannys acting and singing work continued. More recently Danny appeared in 'Happy Valley' with Sarah Lancashire.  In 2017 Danny released his second album 'Uncovered', a self produced collection of original songs. The album was penned, arranged and produced by Danny in the studio. 
One of the songs  'Marilia' was co-written with Alistair Gordon (who also wrote 'Someone Like You' for Russell Watson/Faye Tozier) .

Filmography
 Coronation Street
 Heartbeat
 Peak Practice
 Redcap
 Survivors
 The Tudors
 Where The Heart Is 
 Moving On

References

External links
Official Danny Seward Website

English male television actors
Living people
1976 births
Male actors from Salford
20th-century English male actors
21st-century English male actors